The Criminal is a 1960 British neo-noir crime film produced by Nat Cohen and directed by Joseph Losey, starring Stanley Baker, Sam Wanamaker, Grégoire Aslan, and Margit Saad. Alun Owen wrote the screenplay, from a story by an uncredited Jimmy Sangster.

The film depicts a harsh and violent portrayal of prison life that led to the film being banned in several countries, including Finland.

It was released in the United States as The Concrete Jungle.

Plot

Bannion (Baker) is a career criminal with an entourage of minor criminals and fast girls. He plans a robbery at a racetrack and gets £40,000 - but in reality this is another crook's money. Word is spread of his responsibility and he is sent to prison, where he is a well known figure.

In prison the Italian boss Frank Saffron takes him under his wing and secures a move to a different block through claiming to be a Roman Catholic. He tells him the outside world wants their £40,000 back, but is prepared to give favours if he gets a cut. They make their plans whispering to each other during Sunday mass.

When one of the weaker inmates is planted with a blade and falls to his death in a scuffle with the guards, this triggers a prison riot. The other prison boss O'Hara is less sympathetic to Bannion. During the riot Bannion opens the door to let the guards back in and wins favour of the prison governor. He is transferred to a low security prison for his assistance but is booed by fellow inmates as he leaves.

During the transfer, it is revealed that Bannion paid £40,000 for the riot and a "fast car". The car appears and drives the prison van off the road, rescuing Bannion. However, he has been double crossed. He is taken to a narrow boat where the criminals he robbed are waiting, also with his girlfriend as security.

They flee, but Bannion is hit by a bullet as they escape. They reach a snowy field where Johnny shoots one of his three pursuers before being shot himself. He dies before being able to say where the money is.

Cast

Production
Joseph Losey said he was handed a ready-made script. "It was a concoction of all the prison films Hollywood ever made", he said. "Both Stanley Baker and I refused to work until they let us write our own script. Which is what we did." He says the producers wanted a sequence where the criminals rob a race track but he felt that had been done in The Killing (1956) so he filmed it taking place off screen.

The theme is sung by Cleo Laine.

Reception
According to Losey the film was a commercial success. He said the film was banned in Ireland because so many of the prisoners were Irish Catholics.

The film was reportedly very successful in Paris.

References

External links
 
 
 The Criminal at BFI Screenonline

1960 films
1960 crime drama films
British black-and-white films
British prison drama films
British heist films
1960s English-language films
Films directed by Joseph Losey
Films with screenplays by Jimmy Sangster
Films scored by John Dankworth
1960s prison films
1960s British films